The 2 arrondissements of the Landes department are:
 Arrondissement of Dax, (subprefecture: Dax) with 152 communes.  The population of the arrondissement was 224,716 in 2016.  
 Arrondissement of Mont-de-Marsan, (prefecture of the Landes department: Mont-de-Marsan) with 175 communes. The population of the arrondissement was 180,294 in 2016.

History

In 1800 the arrondissements of Mont-de-Marsan, Dax and Saint-Sever were established. The arrondissement of Saint-Sever was disbanded in 1926.

References

Landes